Jan Dobrogost Bonawentura Krasiński (10 June 1639 – 21 February 1717) was a Polish nobleman (szlachcic).

Biography
He was the son of Jan Kazimierz Krasiński and Ursula Grzybowska. In his youth he studied in the Netherlands and France. Jan became a Royal Colonel (pułkownik królewski) in 1665, and became Recorder of the Crown and voivode of Płock Voivodeship in 1688. He was also starost of Łomża, Warsaw, Nowe Miasto Korczyn, Przasnysz, Sztum, and Opinogóra Górna.

Linked with the court of John III Sobieski, he was an ally, adviser and a friend of the king. He participated in the Battle of Vienna in 1683 commanding a winged hussars squadron.

He became an elector at the court of King Augustus II the Strong in 1697.

Krasiński was a great patron of the arts and founder of many art galleries in the Polish–Lithuanian Commonwealth. Between 1682 and 1695 he ordered to build a magnificent palace in Warsaw, known today as the Palace of the Commonwealth.

He was buried in Węgrów.

References

17th-century births
1717 deaths
Jan Dobrogost
Military personnel of the Polish–Lithuanian Commonwealth